Eastern Uganda campaign may refer to:
 Western Uganda campaign of 1979
 NRA offensives of 1985 and 1986